Kim Mitchell is the first solo effort from Canadian singer and guitarist Kim Mitchell. Mitchell was the former lead singer and guitarist for Max Webster. This extended play was recorded and released right after the band's break-up.

Track listing
All songs written by Kim Mitchell and Pye Dubois.
 "Kids in Action" – 4:30
 "Miss Demeanor" – 3:39
 "Big Best Summer" – 3:36
 "Tennessee Water" – 3:42
 "Chain of Events" – 3:14

Personnel
Kim Mitchell – guitar, lead vocals, producer

Musicians
Robert Sinclair Wilson – bass guitar, vocals
Paul DeLong – drums
Peter Fredette, Bernie LaBarge – background vocals

Production
Jack Richardson – producer
Paul LaChapelle – engineer
Mike Tilka, Tom Berry – executive producers

References

Kim Mitchell albums
Albums produced by Jack Richardson (record producer)
1982 debut EPs
Anthem Records EPs